The National Basketball Association (NBA) is a professional men's basketball league, consisting of thirty teams in North America (twenty-nine in the United States and one in Canada). The NBA was founded in New York City on June 6, 1946, as the Basketball Association of America (BAA). It adopted the name National Basketball Association at the start of the 1949–50 season when it absorbed the National Basketball League (NBL). The NBA is an active member of USA Basketball, which is recognized by the International Basketball Federation (FIBA) as the National Governing Body (NGB) for basketball in the country. The league is considered to be one of the four major professional sports leagues of North America.

There have been 15 defunct NBA franchises, of which nine played in only one NBA season. The Anderson Packers, the original Denver Nuggets, the Indianapolis Jets, the Sheboygan Red Skins, and the Waterloo Hawks had played in the NBL before joining the NBA, while the original Baltimore Bullets had played in the American Basketball League and NBL before joining the NBA. The Packers, Red Skins, and Waterloo Hawks left the NBA for the National Professional Basketball League, and are the only defunct teams to have ceased to exist in a league other than the NBA. The original Bullets were the last defunct team to leave the NBA, having folded during the 1954–55 season, and are the only defunct team to have won an NBA championship. The Chicago Stags, the Indianapolis Olympians, the Cleveland Rebels, the Packers, and the Red Skins qualified for the playoffs in every year they were active in the league.

Among cities that have hosted defunct NBA franchises, Chicago, Cleveland, Denver, Detroit, Indianapolis, Toronto, and Washington, D.C. all currently have an NBA team, while Providence, Rhode Island, Anderson, Indiana and Sheboygan, Wisconsin are all close to an hour away from a market with an NBA franchise and Pittsburgh is two hours away from an NBA franchise. St. Louis and Buffalo would receive replacement franchises that would later relocate.

Defunct teams

See also 
 List of relocated National Basketball Association teams

Notes 
 Not affiliated with the present-day Washington Wizards, who were known as the Chicago Packers from 1961 to 1962.
 Not affiliated with the present-day Washington Wizards, who were known as the Baltimore/Capital/Washington Bullets from 1963 to 1997.
 Not affiliated with the present-day Denver Nuggets
 Not affiliated with the present-day Atlanta Hawks
 The Bullets played 14 games during the 1954–55 season before becoming defunct.
 The Capitols played 35 games during the 1950–51 season before becoming defunct.
 Not affiliated with the National Football League Washington Commanders, who were known as the Washington Redskins from 1937 to 2020
 Not affiliated with the National Hockey League Washington Capitals

References 
General

Specific

 
Defunct National Basketball Association teams
National Basketball Association